Olga Margaret Stewart née Mounsey (1 July 1920 – 6 August 1998) was a prolific Scottish botanist and botanical artist.

Biography

Early life 

Olga Margaret Mounsey was born in Edinburgh to Marjory Brookfield and James Mounsey, a lawyer. She went to schools in Edinburgh and Kent before studying at the Edinburgh College of Art between 1938 and 1939.

World War II 
Between 1939 and 1940 Stewart studied engineering for a year at Dalhousie University, Nova Scotia. She then went on to work as a draughtswoman at Halifax naval dockyard for the National Research Council of Canada between 1940 and 1943. For the remainder of the war she worked for the Royal Navy in Edinburgh.

Post-war & work as botanist 
On 28 November 1946, Stewart married Frank Stewart, a lawyer who later served as Scottish consul for the Principality of Monaco. In 1947, she began drawing flowers in 1947 and joined the Wildflower Society. Steward joined the BSBI in 1967. She quickly became an expert field botanist and in 1975 was appointed botanical recorder for Kirkcudbrightshire. Her botanical illustrations appeared in many BSBI publications, as well as in Mary M. Webster's Flora of Moray, Nairn and East Inverness (1978) and in Princess Grace of Monaco's My Book of Flowers (1980).

Personal life 
Stewart had four children, one of whom became a professional botanist. She also enjoyed curling, and represented Scotland on a tour of western Canada in 1967, continuing to play in Edinburgh until 1996.

Death 
Stewart died in New Abbey, Dumfries, on 6 August 1998, at the age of seventy-seven. In 2012 John Stewart published a complication of verse by Frank Stewart and illustrations by Olga Stewart titled "Wild Flowers and Doggerel".

Works 

 Flowering Plants of Kirkcudbrightshire (1990)

References 

1920 births
1998 deaths
Scottish botanists
British women botanists
Scottish illustrators
Scottish women illustrators
Alumni of the Edinburgh College of Art
British expatriates in Canada